Tortilia graeca is a species of moth in the Stathmopodidae family. It is found in Greece, Crete and Turkey.

The wingspan is 8–10 mm. Adults have been recorded from June to July.

References

Stathmopodidae
Moths of Europe